François Mayo (born 29 March 1967) is a Cameroonian boxer. He competed in the men's light middleweight event at the 1988 Summer Olympics.

References

External links
 

1967 births
Living people
Cameroonian male boxers
Olympic boxers of Cameroon
Boxers at the 1988 Summer Olympics
Place of birth missing (living people)
Light-middleweight boxers
20th-century Cameroonian people